"Hechicera" (English: Sorceress) is the second radio single and the first track from Maná's fifth studio album, Sueños Líquidos in 1997. On the week of December 13, 1997, the song debuted and lasted only one week at the number thirty-six spot on the U.S. Billboard Hot Latin Tracks. It was nominated for a Lo Nuestro Award for Video of the Year.

Charts

References

1997 singles
Maná songs
Spanish-language songs
Songs written by Fher Olvera
Songs written by Alex González (musician)
1997 songs
Warner Music Latina singles